The Marsar Lake is an oligotrophic alpine lake located in Tral valley of Pulwama district in Jammu and Kashmir, India. It is famous for its scenic beauty. It also falls in the close vicinity of Aru valley in Pahalgam. Due to their close proximity and similar physical characteristics, the two lakes are often called as the "twin sisters". The site has over the years become a famous tourist destination. Tarsar-Marsar Trek is one of the highly opted treks of the Kashmir Valley. A stream emerges from this lake, which travels through the Dachigam valley and enters Srinagar near Harwan garden where it fills the Sarband reservoir. This stream (Dagwan Nallah) is joined by another stream which flows from Mount Mahadeo near the Telbal village and from thereon it is called the Telbal nallah which is the primary source of the Dal Lake.

References

See also
Tarsar Lake

Lakes of Jammu and Kashmir
Tourist attractions in Anantnag district